Ann Beattie (born September 8, 1947) is an American novelist and short story writer. She has received an award for excellence from the American Academy and Institute of Arts and Letters and the PEN/Malamud Award for excellence in the short story form.

Career
Born in Washington, D.C., Beattie grew up in Chevy Chase, Washington, D.C. and attended Woodrow Wilson High School. She holds an undergraduate degree from American University and a master's degree from the University of Connecticut.

She gained attention in the early 1970s with short stories published in The Western Humanities Review, Ninth Letter, the Atlantic Monthly, and The New Yorker.  In 1976, she published her first book of short stories, Distortions, and her first novel, Chilly Scenes of Winter, which was later made into a film.

Beattie's style has evolved over the years. In 1998, she published Park City, a collection of old and new short stories, about which Christopher Lehman-Haupt wrote in The New York Times:

Beattie has taught at Harvard College and the University of Connecticut and was for a long time associated with the University of Virginia, where she was first appointed as a part-time lecturer in 1980. She later became Edgar Allan Poe Chair of the Department of English and Creative Writing in 2000 and remained at UVA until 2013, when she resigned over disappointment at the direction in which the university was heading.  In 2005 she was selected as winner of the Rea Award for the Short Story, in recognition of her outstanding achievement in that genre.

Her first novel, Chilly Scenes of Winter (1976), was adapted as a film alternatively titled  Chilly Scenes of Winter or Head Over Heels in 1979 by Joan Micklin Silver, starring John Heard, Mary Beth Hurt, Gloria Grahame, and Peter Riegert. The first version was not well received by audiences, though upon its re-release in 1982, with a new title and ending to match that in book, the movie was successful, and is now considered a cult classic. She was elected a Fellow of the American Academy of Arts and Sciences in 2004.

Recent works

Appraisal of Beattie's recent work has been mixed. Writing in The New York Times, Michiko Kakutani called her novel Mrs. Nixon: A Novelist Imagines a Life (2011) "preposterous," "narcissistic," and "self-indulgent"—the "sort of pretentious volume that makes people hate academics." In The Washington Post, Book World Editor Marie Arana characterized it as "a bill of goods" devoid of "anything resembling a story line" that is "less about the eponymous Mrs. than about an endless parade of wordsmiths trotted out for show." The book "is not, except in the most perfunctory way, about Mrs. Nixon," Arana determined. "It's about Beattie." "[T]he book does not succeed," wrote William Deresiewicz in The Nation. "Its bric-a-brac approach is ultimately wearying: nothing ever quite gets under way. One ends up feeling as if Beattie has spent the whole performance clearing her throat. . . . Her subject often seems a pretext, something just to get the conversation started." By contrast, Dawn Raffel, in the San Francisco Chronicle, called the book "splendidly tricky", "at times... movingly lyrical", and said "Nothing in Mrs. Nixon is perfectly clear, and that is the source of its power."

Mary Pols described her short-story collection The State We're In (2015), which is set in Maine, in The New York Times Book Review as "slippery" and "peculiar." Pols wrote, "I read this collection twice trying to unravel the mystery of what else, beyond Maine, ties these unfinished-feeling stories together."

In a review of Beattie's collection The Accomplished Guest (2017) for The Washington Post, Howard Norman admired Beattie for her "beguiling originality" and determined that "she is one of our few contemporary masters of storytelling." He also wrote, "When I read Beattie's stories, I think of Chekhov's; when I read Chekhov's stories, I think of Beattie's. Both are writers for the ages."

Of Beattie's recent novel A Wonderful Stroke of Luck (2019), Publishers Weekly wrote, "Beattie offers sharp psychological insights and well-crafted prose, but the novel lacks the power and emotional depth of her best work." In The New York Times Book Review, Martha Southgate wrote, "Ultimately, this is a novel in which nothing seems to matter much." She also called the book "shapeless." Southgate nonetheless praised A Wonderful Stroke of Luck for "some elegant sentences and cutting observations that remind a reader of Beattie at her strongest."

Beattie's papers are held by the Albert and Shirley Small Special Collections Library at the University of Virginia.

Personal
Beattie was married to the writer David Gates. The couple divorced in 1980. In 1985, she met the painter Lincoln Perry, and they married in 1998.

She and Perry both taught at the University of Virginia until 2013. From there they moved together to Key West, Florida, where she continues to write.

In 2005, the two collaborated on a published retrospective of Perry's paintings. Entitled Lincoln Perry's Charlottesville, the book contains an introductory essay and artist's interview by Beattie.

Bibliography

Novels
Chilly Scenes of Winter (1976)
Falling In Place (1981); 
Love Always (1986); 
Picturing Will (1989); 
Another You (1995); 
My Life, Starring Dara Falcon (1997); 
The Doctor's House (2002); 
Mrs. Nixon: A Novelist Imagines A Life (2011) 
A Wonderful Stroke of Luck (2019)

Short fiction 
Collections
Distortions (1976); 
Secrets and Surprises (1978); 
The Burning House (1982); 
What Was Mine (1991); 
Where You'll Find Me and Other Stories (1986); 
Park City (1998); 
Perfect Recall (2000); 
Follies: New Stories (2005); 
The New Yorker Stories (2011); 
 
 The Accomplished Guest (2017) 

Stories

Articles and other contributions

Children's Books
Spectacles (1985)

References

External links

Ann Beattie profile at IMDb.
Ann Beatie discusses her writing process on Bookworm in October, 1998
Audio: Ann Beattie reads an essay on ambient sound in the works of Joyce, Yates, and Carver. (Key West Literary Seminar 2008)
 
Narrative 10 Interview with Ann Beattie at Narrative Magazine, Fall 2014.
Online New Yorker story Coping Stones
Online New Yorker story The Rabbit Hole As Likely Explanation

1947 births
Living people
20th-century American novelists
20th-century American short story writers
20th-century American women writers
21st-century American novelists
21st-century American short story writers
21st-century American women writers
American University alumni
American women novelists
American women short story writers
Artists from Washington, D.C.
Fellows of the American Academy of Arts and Sciences
Harvard College faculty
Members of the American Academy of Arts and Letters
Minimalist writers
The New Yorker people
Novelists from Connecticut
Novelists from Maryland
Novelists from Massachusetts
Novelists from Virginia
PEN/Malamud Award winners
People from Chevy Chase, Maryland
University of Connecticut alumni
University of Connecticut faculty
University of Virginia faculty
Woodrow Wilson High School (Washington, D.C.) alumni
Writers from Charlottesville, Virginia
Writers from Washington, D.C.
American women academics